Hanwag GmbH is a German manufacturer of mountaineering boots and hiking boot headquartered in Vierkirchen. Hanwag GmbH is part of Fenix Outdoor concern.

In 1936, Hans Wagner supplied the first ski boots for the Winter Olympics in Garmisch-Partenkirchen, at that time still made of leather. During the war, the factory was looted, but production was soon able to restart, first under the Hawa brand, then eventually as Hanwag (Hans Wagner).

References

External links 
 

German brands
Shoe brands
Shoe companies of Germany